Stick Around may refer to:

 Stick Around (film)
 Stick Around (TV pilot), an unsold television pilot for ABC, starring Andy Kaufman
 Stick Around (song), a song by Julian Lennon
 Stick Around, a song by AC/DC from the album High Voltage
 Stick Around, a song by Nik Kershaw from the album 15 Minutes
 Stick Around, a song by Lukas Graham from the album 3 (The Purple Album)

See also
 Stickin' Around